Oliver Bennett (9 March 1889 – 30 November 1977) was a Trinidadian cricketer. He played in eight first-class matches for Trinidad and Tobago from 1907 to 1911.

See also
 List of Trinidadian representative cricketers

References

External links
 

1889 births
1977 deaths
Trinidad and Tobago cricketers